Marmora is the largest community in the Municipality of Marmora and Lake in Hastings County, Ontario, Canada. It is located on the Crowe River and along Highway 7 between Havelock to the west and Madoc to the east, about the halfway point between Ottawa and Toronto.

History
The rich history of Marmora Township is the story of mining in Eastern Ontario. Since 1820 this Township has played a leading role in the development of iron mining. In addition, copper, lead, silver, gold and lithographic limestone have been extracted.

Iron mining was an important industry in the area during the 19th century. The village was originally named Marmora Iron Works. Gold and silver were also mined at nearby Cordova Mines. A nearby plant processes talc and dolomite.

In 1821, the newly surveyed townships of Elzevir, Madoc and Marmora were added to Hastings County, on the initiative of Charles Hayes, an Irish entrepreneur, in return for his setting up the Marmora Iron Works.

The new Township of Marmora took its name from the Latin word for marble because of an "immense rock of most delicate white marble". This giant rock stood on the southeast corner of Crowe Lake, which took its name from the Crowe First Nations that lived along the shore.

Marmora Township was opened for sale in 1821, but there was little settlement outside of the newly created mining village.

The hamlet of Marmora was separated from the Township and incorporated as a village in 1901. It was re-amalgamated with the surrounding townships of Marmora and Lake in 2001 to form a newly expanded Municipality of Marmora and Lake.

Local attractions and events
Although mining and lumbering have been vital to the Township, agriculture has probably supported more people in the area since 1850. A remaining legacy of iron mining is the Marmora Open Pit Mine, a man-made wonder-lake surrounded by a barbed wire fence, seventy five acres in area, five hundred and fifty feet deep, filled with four hundred feet deep of clear blue spring water that is steadily rising to the top. This location is also a host to a variety of wildlife. The mine itself is filled with several hundred feet of water. The water originates from an underground spring which was exposed during mining operations.

Camping and other outdoor recreational activities such as ATV trail riding, fishing, and hunting are very popular for locals and those on vacation. The Crowe River flows from Crowe Lake, which boasts excellent fishing for bass, muskie, pike, walleye, and a few other types of fish.

Home of Beautiful Glen Allan Park, a cottage and trailer resort since the early 1900s on the north shore of Crowe Lake.

Home to the scenic Crowe Valley Campground, located in town alongside the Crowe River.

A country Jamboree is held in Marmora each year: the "Crowe Valley Jamboree" at the Marmora Fair Grounds in June. (In past years there was another Jamboree in September.)

Annual Marmora Area Canoe and Kayak Festival - Marmora and Lake is the host location as chosen by the Kawartha WhiteWater Paddlers.  After a thorough river review throughout the province Marmora and Lake was chosen for its many rivers.

Home of The Classic Cruisers (car show), running every Thursday at 6 pm throughout the summer.

Former attractions and events
From 1979 to 2017, Marmora SnoFest held the annual Marmora Cup dog-sled races. A Committee of Council was established in 2005 to provide a more defined structure for the running and organizing of the historical event.  A board of directors was then formed in 2007.  With its hosting and running of sled dog races it makes the Marmora SnoFest, host of the Marmora Cup, the longest running event of its type in Canada.

Formerly annual festivities of Punk Fest led by Warren Hastings, a.k.a. Spider, were held here for several years before the township put them to an end, because they would not allow medics on site or supply washrooms/fresh water to the party-goers.  "Punks" and bands from all over the world traveled to Marmora for the weekend's events.

Former home of The Marmora Lakers Men's Senior AAA Hockey Team. It was sold in early 2008.

Notable residents
 Yaphet Kotto - actor
 Sarah and Rob Skinner - Red Dirt Skinners musical group
 Greg Terrion - Toronto Maple Leafs hockey player

References

External links
 Marmora Historical Foundation
 Municipality of Marmora & Lake
 Marmora Medical Centre
 "Crowe Valley Jamboree" (2018, 2019, 2021, 2022, ...)
 Marmora Crowe Valley Lions Club Country Jamboree (Archived.) (Final event was 2017.)
 Marmora Crowe Valley Lions Country Jamboree (Archived.) (2006–2016)
 Marmora Cup Dog-sled races at Marmora SnoFest (Final event was 2017.)
 Crowe Valley Conservation Authority
 Google Maps Satellite Image

Communities in Hastings County
Former villages in Ontario
Populated places disestablished in 2001